The 2023 Liqui Moly Bathurst 12 Hour was an endurance race for FIA GT3 cars and invited vehicles, staged at the Mount Panorama Circuit in Bathurst, New South Wales, Australia, on 5 February 2023. It was the opening round of five in the 2023 Intercontinental GT Challenge.

The race was won by the SunEnergy1 AKKodis ASP Team entered Mercedes-AMG GT3 Evo driven by Kenny Habul, Jules Gounon and Luca Stolz.

Entry list

Class structure
Entries were divided into classes based on car type and driver ratings.
 Class A – GT3 (current-specification GT3 cars)
 Pro - for driving combinations with no driver category restrictions.
 Pro-Am - for driving combinations featuring two FIA Platinum-, FIA Gold- or FIA Silver-rated drivers and one or two FIA Bronze-rated drivers.
 Silver Cup - for driving combinations featuring only FIA Silver- and FIA Bronze-rated drivers
 Bronze - for driving combinations featuring only FIA Bronze-rated drivers.
 Class I – Invitational class
 Class I will be open to MARC Cars, GT2 cars and GTC cars from one-make categories.
 Class I entries are required to have at least one FIA Bronze-rated driver.

Class B was also available for entry for Porsche GT3 Cup cars and Class C was also available for entry for GT4 cars, however due to a lack of entries in both classes, Classes B & C were merged into Class I.

Entries

 – The #50 Vantage Racing entry switched from a KTM X-Bow GT2 Concept to a Audi R8 LMS Evo II following an engine failure during Friday practice.

Qualifying

Qualifying

Top Ten Shootout

Race 

Notes

References

Motorsport in Bathurst, New South Wales
Bathurst